Contactin-associated protein-like 2 is a protein that in humans is encoded by the CNTNAP2 gene. Since the most recent reference human genome GRCh38, CNTNAP2 is the longest gene in the human genome 

This gene encodes a member of the neurexin family which functions in the vertebrate nervous system as cell adhesion molecules and receptors. This protein, like other neurexin proteins, contains epidermal growth factor repeats and laminin G domains. In addition, it includes an F5/8 type C domain, discoidin/neuropilin- and fibrinogen-like domains, thrombospondin N-terminal-like domains and a putative PDZ binding site. This protein is localized at the juxtaparanodes of myelinated axons and associated with potassium channels. It may play a role in the local differentiation of the axon into distinct functional subdomains. This gene encompasses almost 1.6% of chromosome 7 and is one of the largest genes in the human genome. It may represent a positional candidate gene for the DFNB13 form of nonsyndromic deafness.

Clinical significance 

CNTNAP2 has been associated with autism spectrum disorder but accounts for very few cases. CNTNAP2 may also be related to a disorder called specific language impairment.

Recessive mutations in CNTNAP2 result in a disorder that resembles Pitt–Hopkins syndrome.

Interactions 

CNTNAP2 has been shown to interact with CNTN2.

See also 
Brett Abrahams, geneticist and neuroscientist

References

External links

Further reading